The Lithuania National Stadium is a multi-use stadium in Vilnius, Lithuania, that has been under construction since 1987. It is planned mostly for football matches and will host the home matches of the Lithuania national football team. It would replace the demolished Žalgiris Stadium and the current LFF Stadium as the main stadiums in Vilnius.

Construction history
The project for the stadium was prepared by architect Algimantas Nasvytis in 1985. The construction started in 1987, but stopped due to the dissolution of the Soviet Union in 1991. Construction works were fully terminated in 1993. In 2006, the government of Lithuania declared the stadium an object of national importance and arranged new contractors. The work resumed in February 2008, but was abandoned in late 2008 due to lack of funds and corruption allegations. The works cost about LTL 29 million. In November 2009, the Supreme Court of Lithuania annulled the construction contracts. 

New round of preparations started in May 2013. At the time, the Minister of Interior, Dailis Alfonsas Barakauskas, said that it was expected to be finished by 2016 at a cost of around EUR 78 million. In March 2014, the government decided to utilize the public–private partnership model and to request funding from the European Union. A call for bids was announced in September 2016. Two proposals were received by the December 2017 deadline. The lower-cost proposal was dismissed as inappropriate causing a lawsuit. The Supreme Court ruled that the dismissal was lawful in August 2019. Axis Industries, owned by UAB ICOR, was ultimately selected as the builder. The government obtained funds from the European Union but was forced to divert them to other projects due to the delays. Therefore, the project will be financed by the government of Lithuania and by the Vilnius City Municipality. The government approved a 25-year financing by a private equity fund in December 2019. The government agreed to pay the total of EUR 156 million (principal of EUR 93.2 million with interest of 6.87%). The government of Lithuania agreed to cover EUR 54.5 million, while Vilnius City Municipality will pay a total of 101.5 million.

However, in May 2020, the Public Procurement Office blocked the concession contract ruling that the government assumed too much risk for the project. This effectively canceled the project, unless the city municipality successfully appeals the decision to court. Vilnius District Court and the Appeals Court ruled against the Public Procurement Office in November 2020 and April 2021, respectively. Therefore, the project can continue unless one of the parties decides to back out. Demolition of the abandoned skeletal structures began in January 2022.

New design
The design approved in 2019 calls for a 15,000-seat stadium which would meet the requirements for Category 4 UEFA stadium. The stadium will be designed by Populous, a global architecture firm specializing in sport venues. The skeletal structure from earlier constructions will be demolished. The complex will include about thirty other objects. The main other structures include three football fields, 3,000-seat athletics stadium, an indoor complex with areas for gymnastics, handball, volleyball, boxing and six basketball courts, sports museum, community center with a library, 300-seat kindergarten, and 1,600-space parking lot. The national government will operate the sports museum, Vilnius City Municipality will operate the community center and the kindergarten, while Kauno Arena received a concession to operate the stadium and other objects. The construction was first planned to last until 2023, but later this was postponed until July 2025.

See also
 Darius and Girėnas Stadium

References

External links
 Nacionalinis Stadionas at StadiumDB.com
 Project presentation (2019)

Football venues in Lithuania
Stadiums under construction
Sports venues in Vilnius
Buildings and structures in Lithuania
Unfinished buildings and structures